Ibelin can refer to:

 Ibelin (castle), a Crusader castle in the Kingdom of Jerusalem
 Ibelin (town), a settlement connected to the castle
 Lordship of Ibelin, the fief connected to the settlement and castle
 House of Ibelin, a noble family of the crusader kingdom, holders of the castle and lordship

See also
 I'billin, a town in the Plain of Galilee, northern Israel